Aneta Grzeszykowska (1974) is a Polish Artist. 

Her work is included in the collections of the Guggenheim Museum, New York, the Seattle Art Museum, the Rubell Museum, Miami, the Museum of Modern Art, Warsaw and the Zachęta National Gallery of Art.

References

1974 births
20th-century Polish women artists
21st-century Polish women artists
Living people